Marion Boyd may refer to:

Marion Boyd (1946–2022), Canadian politician
Marion Speed Boyd (1900–1988), U.S. federal judge 
Marion Boyd (mistress), mistress of James IV of Scotland